Lawrence Hill railway station is on the Severn Beach Line and Cross Country Route, serving the inner-city districts of Easton and Lawrence Hill in Bristol, England. Its three letter station code is LWH. The station has two platforms, four running lines and minimal facilities. It is managed by Great Western Railway, the seventh company to be responsible for the station and the third franchise since privatisation in 1997.

The station was opened in 1863 by the Bristol and South Wales Union Railway, with a single track and platform. The line was doubled in 1874 when the Clifton Extension Railway opened, then expanded to four tracks and platforms in 1891. There were buildings on all platforms and a goods yard to the west. Service levels reduced significantly over the second half of the twentieth century. The goods facilities were closed in 1965, staff were withdrawn in 1967 and the eastern two platforms were taken out of service by 1974.

The line is due to be electrified as part of the 21st-century modernisation of the Great Western Main Line, which will also see the addition of two new running lines to increase capacity. Service frequency will be improved as part of the Greater Bristol Metro scheme.

Description 
Lawrence Hill railway station serves the Lawrence Hill and Easton areas of Bristol. The surrounding area is primarily residential, with the City Academy school to the east and a First West of England bus depot to the north-west. A supermarket and industrial estate occupy the old goods yard directly west of the station.

The station is on an alignment of 012 degrees, curving towards the east. There are two sets of tracks through the station, and two platforms: the western platform, platform 1, serves northbound trains; the eastern platform, platform 2, serves southbound trains. Platform 2 was part of an "island" platform which, along with a further platform to the east, served the northbound "up fast" southbound "down fast" lines. These platforms were removed around 1970, the fast lines were removed in 1984. Directly to the south of the station, the A420 Church Road crosses the railway on a bridge. The main access to the station is using steps from Church Road, however the northbound platform can be accessed step-free from the adjacent supermarket car park. There is no step-free access to the southbound platform. To the north is a bridge carrying the Bristol and Bath Railway Path, a cycle path built on the trackbed of the Midland Railway Bristol to Gloucester line. Just north of this bridge is Lawrence Hill Junction, where a goods line diverges to the west, serving a waste terminal. To the south there are crossover points, and the line widens to four tracks.

 facilities at the station are minimal. The station is unstaffed and there are no facilities for buying tickets. There are metal and glass shelters and seating on each of the two platforms, as well as customer help points which give next train information and allow the user to contact a helpdesk. The station is covered by CCTV. There is no car park or taxi rank, but there are 12 bicycle stands on the platform. The nearest bus stop is directly outside the station on the A420 Church Road.

The line through Lawrence Hill has a speed limit of  northbound and  southbound. The loading gauge is W8, and the line handles over 15 million train tonnes per year. It is not electrified, though it is planned that it will be electrified by 2017 as part of the 21st-century modernisation of the Great Western Main Line.

Services 

All services at Lawrence Hill are operated by Great Western Railway using  and  Sprinter and  Turbo DMUs.

The typical off-peak service in trains per hour is:

 1 tph to 

On Sundays, the services to Avonmouth and Severn Beach are reduced to hourly. Southbound a single afternoon service continues beyond Bristol to  via Weston-super-Mare.

Express services, operated by CrossCountry pass through the station but do not stop.

History

At New Passage, passengers were transferred to a ferry to cross the Severn to continue on into Wales. To cope with the expected increase in traffic, the line was doubled, and a second platform was added to the east of the two tracks. Two more tracks were added in 1891, giving a layout of two sets of two tracks, with platforms on the outside and on an island in the middle. There were buildings on all the platforms, which were linked by a large covered footbridge. There was a goods yard to the west of the station and a signal box on the central platform.

In 1886, the daily Great Western service along the Clifton Extension Railway was 6 trains each way between Avonmouth and Temple Meads, 24 trains from Clifton Down to Temple Meads and 26 the other direction. By 1910 there were 17 services daily from Avonmouth to Temple Meads and 15 the other way, a further 20 trains each day operating between Clifton Down and Temple Meads. Circular trips via  were also common. The station was also used by excursion trains, and by trains of evacuees during the Second World War. By 1947, just before the start of the British Rail era, there were 33 daily services each direction between Avonmouth and Temple Meads, and 18 on Sundays. Many trains would pass through Lawrence Hill non-stop - in 1930, 350 trains would pass the station each day, of which roughly 40% would stop.

When the railways were nationalised in 1948, Lawrence Hill came under the control of the Western Region of British Railways, which oversaw a gradual decline of services at Lawrence Hill. Passenger numbers along the Clifton Extension Railway, now known as the Severn Beach Line, also dropped, and in 1963 the Beeching report suggested that all services along the line be withdrawn. In the end, services continued to Severn Beach but were discontinued via Henbury and Pilning. Staff were withdrawn from the station from 17 July 1967 as a cost-saving measure. The footbridge was demolished by 1970, forcing passengers to change platform via the steps to Church Road at the south end of the station. Most of the station buildings were demolished in August 1970, but there were still some on the westernmost platform in 1979. By 1974 the platforms serving the eastern tracks had been removed, with the tracks themselves removed in 1984. Plans to use the disused trackbed as part of a light rail scheme linking the city centre to the northern suburbs were formed in the late 1990s, with the aim of an operational scheme by 2008, but the plans had been shelved by 2004. It was suggested in 2008 that the trackbed could be used as a cycle path to join together communities which had been separated by the construction of the M32 motorway, however this was dropped due to Network Rail asserting that the trackbed might be necessary for future rail expansion.

British Rail was split into business-led sectors in the 1980s, at which time operations at Stapleton Road passed to Regional Railways. All trains along the Severn Beach Line ran to Severn Beach, but the service pattern was irregular. This was changed in the mid-1990s, with a more frequent service to Avonmouth but very few on to Severn Beach and no Sunday services. When the railway was privatised in 1997, local services were franchised to Wales & West, which was succeeded by Wessex Trains, an arm of National Express, in 2001. Services along the Severn Beach Line were increased to 10 per day in each direction by 2005, with Bristol City Council providing a subsidy to Wessex Trains. The Wessex franchise was amalgamated with the Great Western franchise into the Greater Western franchise from 2006, and responsibility passed to First Great Western, a subsidiary company of FirstGroup, which was rebranded in 2015 as Great Western Railway. A minimum service requirement was written into the franchise agreement, ensuring an hourly service along the Severn Beach Line. Passenger traffic increased significantly, and in 2010, Sunday services to Severn Beach were restored.

Future 

First Great Western declined a contractual option to continue the Greater Western passenger franchise beyond 2013, citing a desire for a longer-term contract due to the impending upgrade to the Great Western Main Line. The franchise was put out to tender, but the process was halted and later scrapped due to the fallout from the collapse of the InterCity West Coast franchise competition. A two-year franchise extension until September 2015 was agreed in October 2013, and subsequently extended until March 2019.

The line through Lawrence Hill was due to have been electrified by 2017 as part of the Great Western Main Line electrification project, however this has been postponed indefinitely. The group Friends of Suburban Bristol Railways supports the electrification continuing beyond the main lines, as does MP for Weston-super-Mare John Penrose. The electrification scheme also includes the four-tracking of Filton Bank, including the reinstatement of the disused trackbed at Lawrence Hill, to allow more services between Parkway and Bristol Temple Meads and separate fast inter-city services from local stopping services. Enhancement works to allow disabled access to both platforms will be carried out at the same time.

Lawrence Hill is on the / corridor, one of the main axes of the Greater Bristol Metro, a rail transport plan which aims to enhance transport capacity in the Bristol area, including half-hourly services along the Severn Beach Line. Plans for a loop were rejected by the West of England Joint Transport Board, however Bristol City Councillors voted to send the decision back to the board for further discussion.

The station's lack of step-free access to the southbound platform has come under criticism from Bristol West MP Thangam Debbonaire, who noted that due to the time taken to get a train to Stapleton Road and then back to Temple Meads, what should be a five-minute journey could take an hour. Debbonaire stated that step-free access had been promised for some time.

Incidents 

The express locomotive, GWR 4000 Class number 4063 "Bath Abbey", was derailed and badly damaged, with several coaches also being damaged. The incident was blamed on signalman A. H. Toop of the Lawrence Hill signal box, with contributing factors including lax working standards and the driver of the goods train, W. G. Atkins, failing to pull up to the signal box as required.

A similar crash occurred at Lawrence Hill on 1 November 2000, when a Royal Mail train passed two red signals and ran into the back of a coal train at around 3:30am. The mail train, hauled by English Welsh & Scottish  diesel locomotive number 67002 "Special Delivery", with 67012 at the rear, was travelling at 50 mph when the incident occurred. The locomotive climbed over the back of the coal train, coming to rest  later on top of a coal wagon and against the A420 Church Road bridge. The driver of the mail train suffered a broken arm and cuts to the face and chest, but there were no other injuries. The incident was initially suspected to be caused by faulty brakes, but was later found to be caused by misunderstanding and incorrect use of the locomotive's Brake Pipe Pressure Control Unit Isolating Cock by railway staff.

Lawrence Hill is considered a blackspot for railway trespass and vandalism.

See also
 Public transport in Bristol

Notes

References

External links 

 Friends of Suburban Bristol Railways
 Severn Beach Line: Information, Maps & Timetables for Lawrence Hill station

Railway stations in Bristol
DfT Category F2 stations
Former Great Western Railway stations
Railway stations in Great Britain opened in 1863
Railway stations served by Great Western Railway
Severn Beach Line